The Manhattan Mercury is the local newspaper for Manhattan, Kansas.  The Mercury is a daily newspaper published in the afternoon five days a week, and in the morning on Sunday. No Saturday edition is issued.  The newspaper is physically printed on the Mercury's own in-house presses.  The newspaper also maintains an online presence.

History
The Mercury was founded as a weekly publication on May 9, 1884, at a time when Manhattan was already served by two other competing newspapers. It became a daily on February 8, 1909.

After passing through four different owners, the newspaper was purchased by Fay N. Seaton in 1915.  He was the founder of the Seaton publishing group, which still owns the paper.  Fay Seaton ran the paper until his death in 1952.  During his time as publisher, The Mercury bought out all of its in-town rivals, beginning with the Morning Chronicle around 1915.  Seaton thereafter operated the Chronicle as a separate paper until 1943, when it was merged with the Mercury.  In 1926, Seaton purchased the Manhattan Nationalist – the oldest newspaper in Manhattan, dating back to 1859 – and began operating under both names (until 1943).  Fay Seaton's son Fred Andrew Seaton ran another newspaper in the Seaton publishing group, the Hastings (Neb.) Tribune, before entering into politics.

See also
 Media in Manhattan, Kansas
 List of newspapers in Kansas

References

External links
 The Manhattan Mercury, official website

Newspapers published in Kansas
Manhattan, Kansas metropolitan area
Publications established in 1884
Manhattan, Kansas